Louis-Ferdinand Céline, sometimes with the subititle Two Clowns for a Catastrophe, is a 2016 French drama film directed by Emmanuel Bourdieu, starring Denis Lavant, Géraldine Pailhas and Philip Desmeules. It is set in Denmark in 1948 and is about the French writer Louis-Ferdinand Céline, who was in exile with his wife and cat while accused of collaboration during the German occupation of France.

The film is based on the book The Crippled Giant by the American Jewish scholar Milton Hindus, who admired Céline's writings, met him in Denmark in 1948 and described him as a wreck. The film raised discussions about Céline's legacy in France.

Cast

 Denis Lavant as Louis-Ferdinand Céline
 Géraldine Pailhas as Lucette
 Philip Desmeules as Milton Hindus

References

External links
 

2016 biographical drama films
French biographical drama films
Biographical films about writers
Louis-Ferdinand Céline
Films set in 1948
Films set in Denmark
Films directed by Emmanuel Bourdieu
Films based on non-fiction books
2010s French films